The Ugly American is an album by singer/songwriter Mark Eitzel. The second of Eitzel's two covers albums released in 2002 (along with Music for Courage and Confidence), The Ugly American was put out by Thirsty Ear Recordings. It contains new versions of songs Eitzel wrote with his earlier band American Music Club, as arranged by an ensemble of Greek musicians.

Critical reception
AllMusic called the album "a fascinating and pleasurable detour that casts some of [Eitzel's] best songs in a new light."

Track listing
"Western Sky"
"Here They Roll Down"
"Jenny" 
"Nightwatchman" 
"Take Courage" 
"Anything" 
"What Good is Love" 
"Will You Find Me" 
"Last Harbor" 
"Love's Humming"

References

2002 albums
Mark Eitzel albums